Mansfield Township is the name of some places in the U.S. state of New Jersey:
Mansfield Township, Burlington County, New Jersey
Mansfield Township, Warren County, New Jersey

See also
Mansfield Township (disambiguation)

New Jersey township disambiguation pages